Chloe Goodchild is a musician, performer and recording artist.

Biography

Chloë Goodchild studied Music, English and Education at Cambridge and Norwich universities in England from 1972 to 1976 where she graduated as a Music-English teacher with a BEd (Honors) degree. From the late 1970s she evolved her own East-West vocal research, influenced by travels through Africa, India, Turkey, Europe, USA and Canada. Chloe's encounters with indigenous wisdom teachers, spiritual and classical Indian music masters, led to a transformative 'no-mind' experience in Northern India, inspired by the great luminary and saint Anandamayi Ma (1896–1982).  This gave birth to a method of sound and voice, which Chloe eventually named The Naked Voice in 1990. Her autobiography, The Naked Voice – Journey to the Spirit of Sound tells the story of these formative early years and was published by Rider Books in 1993. Chloe Goodchild's daughter, Rebecca Hannah Goodchild Nash, is a classical and jazz pianist, performer, recording artist and jazz tutor at Stowe School, the Bristol Cathedral School and the National Youth Jazz Collective (NYJC) in England. Chloe Goodchild is related to William Goodchild, Veronica Goodchild and Gabrielle Goodchild. William Goodchild is a composer, orchestrator and conductor producing music for film, television and the concert hall. Veronica Goodchild practices as a Jungian psychotherapist. Gabrielle Goodchild is an artist producing etchings and paintings in the West Country of England.

Career 

Chloe Goodchild has worked with international politicians, high-security prisoners in New York and Belfast, Jerry Hall, Oprah Winfrey, Glenn Close, and Angelo Badalamenti. She has performed all over the world, including New York in 2001, Edinburgh, and Dublin in 2012. As a composer, her music has been featured on the soundtrack of Jane Campion's Holy Smoke! and in a celebrity performance of The Vagina Monologues in Madison Square Garden.

The Naked Voice 

Founder of The Naked Voice, Chloe Goodchild has synthesised Indian philosophy and classical music teachings with Japanese martial art movements.

Facilitators of the Naked Voice work who have trained with Goodchild are members of the Naked Voice Association in the UK.

Recorded and written work

Chloë Goodchild solo and compilation albums include Devi, Fierce Wisdom, A Thousand Ways of Light and the Grammy nominated Sura. Goodchild and Rumi poet, Coleman Barks, recorded two Rumi albums: There is Some Kiss We Want and The Glance. Chloe has collaborated and recorded with Angelo Badalamenti, Byzantine composer John Tavener and film director Jane Campion (Holy Smoke). Chloë Goodchild's latest book entitled The Naked Voice – Transform Your Life Through The Power of Sound – was published in May 2015 by North Atlantic Books. In 2019 Chloe launched her podcast, VOCE Dialogues (Voices of Compassionate Evolution), inviting teachers and authors in the fields of sound, spirituality and the new sciences, to participate in unlocking and activating the tools and skills required for the evolution of courageous and compassionate communication. Guests have included Andrew Harvey, Mark Nepo, Mark Matousek and Jill Purce.

References

External links 
Official Website of Chloe Goodchild
Official Website of The Naked Voice
VOCE Dialogues Podcast

Year of birth missing (living people)
Living people
British women singers
British composers